Tomás Alexandre Rente de Azevedo (born 12 October 2000) is a Portuguese professional footballer who plays as a midfielder for Benfica B in Liga Portugal 2.

Playing career
On 27 July 2019, Azevedo signed a professional contract with Benfica B. He made his professional debut with Benfica B in a 2–0 LigaPro win over Casa Pia A.C. on 7 February 2021.

References

External links
 
 
 

2000 births
Living people
Sportspeople from Setúbal
Portuguese footballers
Portugal youth international footballers
Association football midfielders
Liga Portugal 2 players
S.L. Benfica B players